Guul University is a private, not-for-profit foundation university located in Mogadishu, Somalia.

History
Established in 2000, Guul University is a private not-for-profit foundation university located in Mogadishu, Somalia. Guul University is authorized as a degree granting institution by the Somali Ministry of Education Directorate of Higher Education and Culture and is a member of the Somali Research and Educational Network (SomaliREN).

Governance

The board of trustees
Guul University has a board of trustees from academia and the business community.

The University Council
The University Council is the executive body, which is responsible for the strategic development of the University and recommends measures to raise its profile and increase its performance and competitiveness and consists of the President, Vice Presidents, Deans & Directors. Technical committees are called in for support as needed. The council appoints senior officials of the university with the exception of the university President.

The University Senate 
The University Senate is made up of representatives of all constituencies of the campus community, including faculty, staff, graduate and undergraduate students. The senate provides an opportunity for faculty, staff, students, and administrators to participate in shared governance. The Senate votes on policy-related issues and other governing aspects that directly affect the day-to-day functions of the University. 
The primary function of the Senate is to advise the University President on any matter or concern, including education, budget, personnel, campus-community, long range plans, facilities, and faculty, staff and student affairs. The Senate meets on quarterly basis to vote on proposals and other matters as submitted by its committees.

Faculties
Guul University is a private, one-faculty university in Mogadishu, Somalia. Guul University is dedicated solely to medicine, with the intention of developing doctors for Somalia and beyond.

Guul University is devoted to excellence in teaching, learning, and research, and to developing leaders in medicine who make a difference locally and globally. Guul University is made of up of the Faculty of Health Sciences, School of Medicine. The School offers the following programmes:

Undergraduate
Bachelor of Medicine, Bachelor of Surgery (M.B., Ch.B.)
Postgraduate
Master of Medicine (M.Med) in Internal Medicine
Master of Medicine (M.Med) in Paediatrics and Child Health
Master of Medicine (M.Med) in Obstetrics & Gynaecology

References 

Universities and colleges in Somalia
2000 establishments in Somalia
Educational institutions established in 2000
Universities in Mogadishu